Kuhsar-e Bala (also Romanized as Kūhsār-e Bālā; also known as Esrakh-e Kūhsār-e Bālā (Persian: آسرخ كهسوبالا)) is a village in Dehaj Rural District, Dehaj District, Shahr-e Babak County, Kerman Province, Iran. At the 2006 census, its population was 197, in 28 families.

References 

Populated places in Shahr-e Babak County